Liliʻuokalani, the last monarch of Hawaii, died November 11, 1917. The royal standard (flag) was raised over her home at Washington Place to signal to the public that she was deceased. Under military guard, her body was moved at midnight for embalming. After the traditional Hawaiian mourning of chanting and wailing, the public was allowed to view her body covered only by a shroud. Her state funeral was held in the throne room of Iolani Palace, on November 18, 1917, followed by her funeral procession to the Royal Mausoleum of Mauna ʻAla. An estimated 1,500 adults and children were in the funeral procession.

Death

She died at her residence Washington Place, at 8:30 a.m. on November 11, 1917, at the age of seventy-nine. According to her lady-in-waiting Lahilahi Webb, the Queen had been in rapidly failing health and diminished mental capacity during the weeks immediately preceding her death. Besides Webb, those who were with her at the end were her doctor William Cotton Hobdy, Prince Jonah Kūhiō Kalanianaʻole, and his wife Elizabeth Kahanu Kalanianaʻole. Her private secretary and trustee of her deed of trust, Curtis P. Iaukea, immediately raised her royal standard (flag) over Washington Place to signal her death. Iaukea's wife Charlotte Kahaloipua Hanks, and two elderly royal retainers Wakeke Ululani Heleluhe and Onaala, were also in attendance at the Queen's death.

State funeral
Iaukea was in charge of making the funeral arrangements, but territorial governor Lucius E. Pinkham accorded her the honor of a state funeral and took charge of it. According to Hawaiian tradition, it was believed that the birth and death of an aliʻi would be heralded by a natural phenomena. Schools of the red āweoweo fish, traditionally associated with the death of a member of the Hawaiian royal family, were seen off the coast of Oahu months before Liliuokalani's death.

Following the raising of the royal standard, Hawaiian royalty and non-royalty arrived to pay their respects. The Hawaiian National Guard under Brigadier General Samuel Johnson was stationed at the gates. In accordance with Native Hawaiian tradition that dictated the body of a deceased royal could only be moved after dark, Liliuokalani's body was transferred under military guard at midnight on Monday along torch-lit streets to Kawaiahaʻo Church for embalming. On Tuesday, her body lay in state for 12 hours without a casket, covered only by a silk shroud, for the traditional Hawaiian mourning of chanting and wailing. Afterwards, the body was placed inside the casket for viewing until 6 p.m. on Saturday. She received a state funeral in the throne room of Iolani Palace, on November 18, 1917.

As her catafalque was moved from the palace up Nuuanu Avenue with 1200-foot ropes pulled by 204 stevedores, for entombment with her family members in the Kalākaua Crypt of the Royal Mausoleum of Mauna ʻAla, composer Charles E. King led a youth choir in "Aloha ʻOe". The song was picked up by the procession participants and the crowds of people along the route. Films were taken of the funeral procession and later stored at ʻĀinahau, the former residence of her sister and niece. A fire on August 1, 1921, destroyed the home and all its contents, including the footage of the Queen's funeral.

For a week, the casket was placed on a bier in the underground Kalākaua Crypt where Webb, Wakeke and her daughter Myra Heleluhe stood vigil over the remains. On November 26, following a ceremony officiated by many of the participants of the earlier funeral, the casket was sealed in a niche adjoining the one containing her husband John Owen Dominis.

W. F. Aldrich created a film of the state funeral.

Since the state funeral took place during the recess of the territorial legislature, Kūhiō, Iaukea, William Owen Smith and five other businessmen and politicians borrowed money from the Bank of Hawaii to cover the expenditures. The state funeral cost the territorial government a total of $8,500.

Procession order

Although exact counts vary in the news coverage, it was estimated that thousands adults and children marched in the funeral procession. The order of procession also varied slightly in different sources.

Gallery

See also
Death and two state funerals of Kalākaua

Citations

References

External links

Funerals by person
State funerals in the United States
History of Hawaii
1917 in Hawaii
Deaths by person in Hawaii
House of Kalākaua